Crego is a surname. Notable people with the surname include:

 Ángel Crego (born 1964), Spanish football manager
 Ralph Crego (1893–1989), American politician
 Mrs. I. L. Crego, owner of the historical Mrs. I. L. Crego House
 Crego, a character in season 1, episode 28 of Gunsmoke (television show)

See also
 Crego (disambiguation)
 Greco (surname)